Tomopterna (common names: sand frogs, burrowing frogs, Old World bullfrogs) is a genus of frogs from sub-Saharan Africa.

Species
The following species are recognised in the genus Tomopterna:
 Tomopterna ahli (Deckert, 1938)
 Tomopterna branchi Wilson and Channing, 2019
 Tomopterna cryptotis (Boulenger, 1907) — common sand frog
 Tomopterna delalandii (Tschudi, 1838) — Delalande's sand frog
 Tomopterna elegans (Calabresi, 1927)
 Tomopterna gallmanni Wasonga & Channing, 2013
 Tomopterna kachowskii Nikolskii, 1900
 Tomopterna  krugerensis Passmore & Carruthers, 1975 — knocking sand frog
 Tomopterna luganga Channing, Moyer & Dawood, 2004
 Tomopterna marmorata (Peters, 1854) — marbled sand frog
 Tomopterna milletihorsini (Angel, 1922)
 Tomopterna monticola (Fischer, 1884)
 Tomopterna natalensis (Smith, 1849) — Natal sand frog
 Tomopterna tandyi Channing & Bogart, 1996 — Tandy's sand frog
 Tomopterna tuberculosa (Boulenger, 1882) — rough sand frog
 Tomopterna wambensis Wasonga & Channing, 2013

References

 
Pyxicephalidae
Amphibians of Sub-Saharan Africa
Amphibian genera
Taxa named by Gabriel Bibron
Taxa named by Auguste Duméril